The Battle of the Svatove-Kreminna line is a series of ongoing military engagements between Russia and Ukraine in Eastern Ukraine along a frontline running from the village of Tavilzhanka in the northeast, the city of Svatove in central, and to the city of Kreminna in the south. The battle began on 2 October 2022, a day after the Ukrainian Army recaptured the nearby city of Lyman.

Background 

After Russia began their invasion of Ukraine, Svatove quickly fell on March 6 during the Eastern campaign. One month later, Russia announced the Donbas Offensive on 18 April, 2022, and Kreminna was the first city in the Donbas to be captured. Through the summer, Russia made slow, costly gains through the rest of Luhansk, northern Donetsk, and eastern Kharkiv Oblast.

Battle 
On the night of 27–28 September, Ukrainian forces crossed the Siverskyi Donets River in Dronivka, stormed the Siverskyi Donets Forest Park, and successfully blocked the critical Kreminna-Torske road. Surviving troops from the BARS-13 detachment and 20th Combined Arms Army, previously based in Lyman where they sustained heavy casualties during the second battle for the town, reestablished themselves in Kreminna.

On 2 October, Ukrainian forces began heavily bombarding Russian positions in Kreminna, advancing as far as the R-66 highway. The following day, Ukrainian troops managed to intersect a segment of the highway between Chervonopopivka and Pishchane, although were pushed back by Russian forces. To counter Ukrainian advances, Russian forces had mined all roads between Kreminna and Svatove. Between 2 and 13 October, Ukrainian troops recaptured 14 towns and villages, including Borova, along the Kharkiv-Luhansk border. Ukrainian forces also advanced towards Chervonopopivka on the Svatove-Kreminna highway, although they  were pushed back from their positions by October 5. Two more villages were recaptured by Ukrainian forces on 24 October.

During November, there were little territorial changes due to the muddy terrain, although fierce battles raged every day. Much of the Russian defense line in northern Luhansk oblast became staffed with newly-mobilized Russian reservists throughout the month.

On the night of 2 November, Ukrainian sources claimed to have destroyed an entire Russian battalion near the town of Makiivka, in Svatove Raion. According to a Russian survivor of the attack, out of the 570 soldiers in his unit, 29 survived, 12 were wounded, while the other 529 men had been killed. Furthermore, some Russian sources claimed that the unit to which the battalion belonged, the 362nd Motorized Rifle Regiment, lost 2,500 men killed in just 12 days at a position near Svatove, and only had 100 men left to man the defense line. The same source also claimed that 300 Russian wounded who attempted to crawl back to their positions were treated as “deserters”, although neither of these reports could be independently verified at the time.

On 18 November, an incident occurred when 12 surrendering Russian soldiers were killed by Ukrainian forces. The Ukrainians claimed that the Russians had committed an act of perfidy firing at them while surrendering, but the Russians deny this. In early December, Ukrainian forces broke through Russian lines around Chervonopopivka, with fighting mostly centered west of the R-66 highway connecting Kreminna and Svatove. By early December, Ukraine had advanced to the hills west of Chervonopopivka.

Throughout December, relentless battles occurred along the line, with both Russian and Ukrainian forces launching daily attacks to varying degrees of success.
On 18 December, a geolocated video showed Ukrainian forces advancing in the Serebryansky forest south of Kreminna. On 26 December, Luhansk Oblast governor Serhiy Haidai claimed that fighting was ongoing near Kreminna, with the Russian command installed there recently moving to Rubizhne, however this claim remains unverified as of early January 2023. On 12 January 2023, Ukrainian forces reported shelling by Russians against west Kreminna, possibly indicating battles ongoing near that area.

By the end of January 2023, Ukraine confirmed its advances along the line had slowed.

Russian counteroffensive
On the night between January 26 and 27, Russian forces began preparing for a large-scale offensive west of Kreminna, launching small ground attacks near Dibrova. Clashes broke out along the frontline, with Russian forces conducting attacks towards Ukrainian positions in Chervonopopivka, Ploshchanka, Nevske, and west of Kreminna, These clashes continued throughout the rest of January, increasing in intensity with Ukraine conducting some counterattacks and artillery attacks, although there were no confirmed territorial changes. A Ukrainian soldier on the frontlines between Svatove and Kreminna stated Russian ground attacks usually consist of around 15 men.  

Much of the fighting and counterattacks between Ploshchanka and Kreminna is done by the 144th Motorized Division of Russia, according to the ISW. 

By February 8, the ISW claimed that the Russian offensive along the Svatove-Kreminna line had unofficially begun, although had only made marginal gains in the vicinity of Dvorichna. That same day, photos emerged of a destroyed Russian BMPT Terminator, the first loss of such vehicle in the war. Drone warfare has also become prevalent in the area. 

Luhansk Oblast governor Serhiy Haidai corroborated these claims of the start of the offensive, stating "there has been a significant increase in attacks and shelling." Conversely, LPR president Leonid Pasechnik claimed Ukraine was bringing reinforcements to the area, and that the situation was "very difficult" as both sides are entrenched in their positions.

By March 16, Russian forces were believed to be "nearing culmination, if it has not already culminated" with just an additional 233.94 square kilometers captured in the counteroffensive.

See also 
 Outline of the Russo-Ukrainian War

References 

Svatove-Kreminna line
Svatove-Kreminna line
Battles of the war in Donbas
Eastern Ukraine offensive
History of Luhansk Oblast
October 2022 events in Ukraine
December 2022 events in Ukraine
November 2022 events in Ukraine
January 2023 events in Ukraine
Svatove-Kreminna_line